Charles Hicks (born 25 July 2001) is a British middle- and long-distance runner. He is the 2022 NCAA Cross Country champion and a two-time European U23 Cross Country champion (2021, 2022), the first British male or female to repeat as Euro U23 winner.

Career
Born and raised in London, Charles Hicks moved with his family to Florida at age 12. He studies cognitive science at Stanford University.

In 2021, he won the men's under-23 title at the European Cross Country Championships in Dublin.

In April 2022, Hicks set a British U23 10,000 metres record with a time of 27:40.16. On 19 November, the 21-year-old won won the men's race at the NCAA Division I Cross Country Championships held in Stillwater, Oklahoma, becoming the first Stanford runner, the fourth British runner and the first British runner for over 30 years to win the NCAA XC individual title. He set a course record of 28:43.6 on a hilly 10-kilometer circuit. The following month, Hicks successfully defended his European Cross Country U23 title with a commanding 8-second victory in Turin, Italy.

Personal bests

 1500 metres – 3:43.59 (Berkeley, CA 2021)
 3000 metres – 7:43.84 (Seattle, WA 2022)
 3000 metres indoor – 7:59.02 (New York, NY 2022)
 5000 metres – 13:24.58 (Stanford, CA 2022)
 10,000 metres – 27:40.16 (Stanford, CA 2022)

NCAA
Charles Hicks is a NCAA Champion, 7-time NCAA Division I All-American cross country and track runner who's won 4 Pacific-12 Conference championship titles.

Source:

High School
Hicks placed 3rd in the 2019 New Balance Indoor Nationals 2 mile (8:59.81). Hicks placed 14th in 2018 Nike Cross Nationals in 15:16.3.

Hicks placed 9th 2018 New Balance Indoor Nationals 2 mile (9:09.27). Hicks placed  9th in 2017 Nike Cross Nationals in 15:27.2.

Hicks place 36th in the 2016 Foot Locker Cross Country Championships in 15:54.9.

Hicks is a 5-time FHSAA state champion and 5-time high school All-American.

Hicks set Bolles High School Track records in the mile (4:07.74), 3200m (8:49.62), 4x800m relay (7:52.50) and DMR (10:18.91).

Source:

References

External links
 
 Charles Hicks at Stanford Cardinal
 Charles Hicks at Power of 10
 Charles Hicks's Channel on YouTube
 

2001 births
Living people
Sportspeople from London
Athletes from London
English male middle-distance runners
British male middle-distance runners
English male long-distance runners
British male long-distance runners
21st-century British people